Bénédicte Savoy (born 22 May 1972 in Paris) is a French art historian, specialising in the critical enquiry of the provenance of works of art, including looted art and other forms of illegally acquired cultural objects.

Savoy is professor of modern art history at the Technical University of Berlin, Germany. From 2016 to 2021, she was professor for cultural history of European Artistic Heritage from the 18th to 20th centuries at the Collège de France in Paris. Commissioned by the French president in 2018, she and economist and writer Felwine Sarr from Senegal are the authors of a report on the restitution of African cultural heritage.

Biography and career 
As a high school student, Savoy attended the Beethoven-Gymnasium in West Berlin in 1988/89. She then studied German language and civilisation at the École Normale Supérieure in Fontenay, France, which she completed in 1994 with a master's thesis on the visual artist Anselm Kiefer. In 1996, she received the agrégation (license to teach in French high schools).

From 1998 to 2001, she was research assistant at the Centre Marc Bloch in Berlin and lecturer both at the Technical University and the Free University in Berlin. In 2000, she received her doctorate from the University of Paris VIII with a dissertation on French art theft in Germany. From 2003 to 2009, Savoy was a junior professor at the Institute for History and Art History at Technical University of Berlin. Since 2009, she has been professor of modern art history at the same university.

Savoy is a member of the Board of Trustees of the German Federal Cultural Foundation. After a series of lectures as a guest lecturer in June 2015, Savoy was appointed professor at the Collège de France in 2016: She held the chair of Histoire culturelle du patrimoine artistique en Europe, XVIIIe-XXe siècles until 2021.

Expert on the ethics of cultural collections 
Savoy is internationally known as an expert on the ethics of ownership of cultural collections and research on the provenance of cultural heritage in the context of "translocations" of artworks. Since her 2003 study of the cultural heritage looted in Germany by French troops during the Napoleonic Wars (French title: Patrimoine annexé. Les biens culturels saisis par la France en Allemagne autour de 1800), she has published several books, academic papers and articles on the illicit transfer of cultural goods.

Commissioned by French president Emmanuel Macron in 2018, Savoy and Senegalese academic Felwine Sarr investigated the possibility of returning cultural items from French state-owned museums to African countries. This resulted in their report on the restitution of African cultural heritage in November 2018, which presents a detailed analysis of the African cultural heritage in France as well as recommendations and an outline for possible restitutions.

In her book Africa's Struggle for Its Art: History of a Post-Colonial Defeat, first published in German in 2021, Savoy documented the numerous endeavours by African nations to recover cultural objects acquired under colonial circumstances during the 1970s and the 1980s. Following her and Felwine Sarr's 2018 report on the restitution of African cultural heritage, she shows "how extensively these stories have been silenced and suppressed by European cultural leaders." In Acquiring Cultures: Histories of World Art on Western Markets, Savoy and her co-authors published various studies on the "history of seizure, trade and collecting of non-Western heritage from Asia, the Pacific, the Indian subcontinent, Africa, Australia and the Americas, and the foundation of public or private collections in Europe and the United States" since the mid-18th-century.

As member of the academic community of art historians in Berlin, she has been involved in the debates on the restitution of African cultural heritage in German collections and actively participates in research and public discussions about this issue. Until 2017, she was member of the advisory board of the Humboldt Forum in Berlin, but resigned from this committee, because of her negative assessment of the future museum's handling of art objects that originate from Germany's former colonial territories.

In 2020, Savoy and other art historians at the Technical University of Berlin and the University of Oxford's Pitt Rivers Museum were appointed to carry out a joint research project called Restitution of Knowledge to study, how art and cultural assets from other countries were collected in major museums of Europe.

Since 2019, Savoy has also been a member of the newly established board of the Junge Akademie, an interdisciplinary research organisation, which is jointly supported by the two oldest academies for sciences in Germany, the German National Academy of Sciences Leopoldina and the Berlin-Brandenburg Academy of Sciences and Humanities. She became member of the latter in 2016.

Awards and recognition 
 2009: Walter-de-Gruyter-Prize, Berlin-Brandenburg Academy of Sciences and Humanities
 2011: Richard Hamann Prize for Art History awarded by Philipps Universität Marburg, Germany
 2013: Knight of the National Order of Merit, France 
 2014: Prize for excellent teaching awarded by the Society of Friends of the Technische Universität Berlin
 2015: Prix du Rayonnement de la langue et de la littérature françaises awarded by the Académie Française
 2015: Prix de l’Académie de Berlin 
 2016: Gottfried Wilhelm Leibniz Prize awarded by the German Research Foundation
 2017: Kythera-Prize awarded by the Kythera-Kulturstiftung 
 2021: Carl Friedrich Gauß-Medaille of the Braunschweig scientist society 
 2022: Glas der Vernunft, Kasseler Bürgerpreis 
 2022: Franco-German Media Prize awarded by the Franco-German Journalism Prize 
 2022: Knight of the Legion of Honour, France 
2022: Prize of the German Cultural Council
In 2020, their report about the restitution of African cultural heritage and its public response earned Bénédicte Savoy and Felwine Sarr the third place in the annual ranking of the "Most influential People in the international Art World", established by ArtReview magazine, and Time magazine listed them among the "100 Most Influential People of 2021".

See also 
 Report on the restitution of African cultural heritage
 Decolonization of museums

Further reading

References

External links 

  at the Technical University of Berlin
 Publications by Bénédicte Savoy in the WorldCat library catalogue
 Article on provenance research and German colonial ethnographic collections today

1972 births
French art historians
Women art historians
Living people
Academic staff of the Technical University of Berlin
Chevaliers of the Légion d'honneur
Gottfried Wilhelm Leibniz Prize winners
Knights of the Ordre national du Mérite
École Normale Supérieure alumni
Paris 8 University Vincennes-Saint-Denis alumni
Academic staff of the Collège de France